PKP class Ol49 is a class of ordinary passenger (O) 2-6-2 (l) steam engine designed in 1949 and used in Poland by the Polskie Koleje Państwowe (Polish State Railways) (PKP).  A total of 116 were built between 1951 and 1954, 112 for the PKP and four for export to North Korea, by Fablok in Chrzanów.

They replaced the older Ok1 and Ok22.

Several examples are still in use, based out of Wolsztyn, while others have been mounted at various locations across Poland.

See also
PKP classification system

References

Further reading

Railway locomotives introduced in 1951
2-6-2 locomotives
Ol49
Fablok locomotives
Passenger locomotives
Standard gauge locomotives of Poland